Gardens of Stone is a 1987 American drama film directed by Francis Ford Coppola, based on a novel of the same name by Nicholas Proffitt. It stars James Caan, Anjelica Huston, James Earl Jones, D. B. Sweeney, Dean Stockwell and Mary Stuart Masterson.

Plot
A hardened Korean and Vietnam War veteran, Sergeant First Class Clell Hazard (James Caan) would rather be an instructor at the U.S. Army Infantry School at Fort Benning to train soldiers for Vietnam but instead is assigned to the 1st Battalion 3d Infantry Regiment (The Old Guard) at Fort Myer, Virginia, which provides the ceremonial honor guard for the funerals of fallen soldiers and guards the Tomb of the Unknown Soldier at Arlington National Cemetery. Hazard calls them the "toy soldiers" and hates his job until Jackie Willow (D. B. Sweeney), the son of an old friend and fellow soldier, is assigned to his platoon; Hazard sees in him an opportunity to make sure at least one man comes home from Vietnam alive.

Hazard tries to warn Willow about Vietnam but Willow sees it as his duty as a soldier to fight for his country, no matter what kind of war it is facing. Hazard hates how the war in Vietnam is being fought and feels that good soldiers are being wounded and killed in the "wrong" war in which the U.S. is not fighting to win.

Among the others in Hazard's life are his longtime friend and superior, Sergeant Major "Goody" Nelson (James Earl Jones), and his girlfriend Samantha Davis (Anjelica Huston), a writer for The Washington Post who is against the Vietnam War for different reasons. Willow marries a colonel's daughter named Rachel Feld (Mary Stuart Masterson), who at first refuses to marry Jackie as long as he is a soldier. Rachel also hates the war in Vietnam and is afraid for her husband.

Hazard is divorced and hasn't seen his son in years due to the bitter divorce. After Willow's father, who is a retired U.S. Army master sergeant and a former Korean War comrade in arms of Hazard's and Nelson's, dies of a heart attack, Hazard comes to look upon Willow as a "son." He tries to teach Willow all he can about soldiering and surviving in combat.

Willow in turn tries to teach his platoon-mate Private Albert Wildman, a chronic screw-up, how to be a soldier. Wildman is later ordered to Vietnam, where he distinguishes himself as a heroic soldier and effective combat infantryman. He returns from Vietnam promoted to the rank of sergeant and is a recipient of the Medal of Honor for heroism in combat. Sergeant Flanagan (Larry Fishburne), a fellow member of Hazard's platoon, receives his orders for Vietnam at the same time.

Willow excels, is promoted to sergeant and is recommended to attend Officer's Candidate School, which he completes and is commissioned as a second lieutenant. He is ordered to serve in a combat unit in Vietnam. Willow writes Hazard from Vietnam about all the good men in his platoon that are being lost in combat. Hazard then finds out that Willow has been killed in action when he sees the burial orders for Willow's remains.

Hazard requests to be sent to Vietnam for his third tour of duty as a platoon sergeant in a combat infantry unit. He places his Combat Infantryman Badge on Willow's flag-draped coffin at the chapel at Arlington National Cemetery. Wildman and Flanagan, at that time both sergeants and just recently returned from Vietnam, are also present at Willow's funeral.

The film ends with military honors being rendered at Willow's graveside at Arlington and Hazard speaking to the mourners prior to the firing of the rifle salute and the playing of "Taps".

Cast
 James Caan as Sergeant First Class Clell Hazard, Platoon Sergeant.
 Anjelica Huston as Samantha Davis
 James Earl Jones as Sergeant Major "Goody" Nelson, Regimental Sergeant Major.
 D. B. Sweeney as Specialist / Sergeant / Second Lieutenant Jack "Jackie" Willow, Honor Guardsman.
 Dean Stockwell as Captain Homer Thomas, Hazard's Company Commander.
 Mary Stuart Masterson as Rachel Feld
 Dick Anthony Williams as First Sergeant R. "Slasher" Williams, Company First Sergeant.
 Lonette McKee as Betty Rae Nelson, Sergeant Major Nelson's Wife.
 Sam Bottoms as First Lieutenant Webber, Hazard's Platoon Leader.
 Elias Koteas as Specialist Pete Deveber, Company Clerk.
 Larry Fishburne as Sergeant / Specialist Flanagan, Jack Willow's Squad Leader.
 Casey Siemaszko as Sergeant Albert Wildman, Jack's Friend In The Platoon.
 Peter Masterson as Colonel Feld
 Carlin Glynn as Mrs. Feld

Reception
The film earned mixed reviews from critics, as it currently holds a 44% rating on Rotten Tomatoes based on 16 reviews. The film was entered into the 15th Moscow International Film Festival.

Production
The film marked Caan's return to filmmaking after a number of years' absence.

Griffin O'Neal was initially cast in Gardens of Stone to play Albert Wildman, but was replaced by Casey Siemaszko after his involvement in the accidental speedboating death of Coppola's eldest son, Gian-Carlo Coppola, in May 1986.

Box office
The movie had a limited release (612 theaters) and ended up grossing $5,262,047. According to Box Office Mojo the movie also made $1,645,588 on its opening weekend.

References

External links
 
 
 
 
 Movie stills

1987 films
1987 drama films
American drama films
Films based on American novels
Films directed by Francis Ford Coppola
Films produced by Francis Ford Coppola
Vietnam War films
American Zoetrope films
TriStar Pictures films
Films with screenplays by Ronald Bass
Films scored by Carmine Coppola
1980s English-language films
1980s American films